The MONY Arizona Classic was a golf tournament on the Champions Tour from 1984 to 1989. It was played in Sun City West, Arizona at the Hillcrest Golf Club (1984–1988) and in Phoenix, Arizona at the Pointe Golf Club (1989).

The purse for the 1989 tournament was US$300,000, with $45,000 going to the winner. The tournament was founded in 1984 as the Senior PGA Tour Roundup.

Winners
MONY Arizona Classic
 1989 Bruce Crampton

The Pointe/Del E. Webb Arizona Classic
 1988 Al Geiberger

Del E. Webb Arizona Classic
 1987 Billy Casper

Del E. Webb Senior PGA Tour Roundup
 1986 Charles Owens

Senior PGA Tour Roundup
 1985 Don January
 1984 Billy Casper

Source:

References

Former PGA Tour Champions events
Golf in Arizona
Sports in Phoenix, Arizona
Recurring sporting events established in 1984
Recurring events disestablished in 1989
1984 establishments in Arizona
1989 disestablishments in Arizona